The White-faced Meadowhawk (Sympetrum obtrusum) is a dragonfly of the genus Sympetrum. It is found in the northern United States and southern Canada. Adult males are identifiable by a distinctive pure white face and red bodies.

Similar species
Juvenile White-faced Meadowhawks are almost indistinguishable from the Ruby and Cherry-faced Meadowhawks. The three species habitats also overlap extensively. White-faces can be identified by having white faces, as the name implies, at maturity.
Sympetrum internum – Cherry-faced Meadowhawk
Sympetrum rubicundulum – Ruby Meadowhawk

References

External links 
 Species Sympetrum obtrusum - White-Faced Meadowhawk, BugGuide.Net

Libellulidae
Insects described in 1867